Antioch is an unincorporated community in the southwestern part of Wright Township, Greene County, Indiana, United States.  It lies near the intersection of County Road 575 North and County Road 500 North, which is a community nearly twenty miles west of the city of Bloomfield, the county seat of Greene County.  Its elevation is 531 feet (162 m), and it is located at  (39.0986542 -87.2375146).

Geography
Bethel Cemetery is about two miles directly east of this community, and it is located near the corner of County Road West 575 North and County Road 1375 West at  (39.1039321 -87.1994581).

School districts
 Linton-Stockton School Corporation, including a high school.
 Metropolitan School District of Shakamak, including a high school.
 These are part of the Southwestern Indiana Conference for IHSAA-sanctioned athletic events.

Political districts
 State House District 45
 State Senate District 39

References

External links
  Roadside Thoughts for Antioch, Indiana
 Linton-Stockton School Corporation
 Metropolitan School District of Shakamak

Unincorporated communities in Greene County, Indiana
Unincorporated communities in Indiana
Bloomington metropolitan area, Indiana